"You're the Best Thing About Me" is a song by Irish rock band U2. It is the third track on their fourteenth studio album, Songs of Experience, and was released as its lead single on 6 September 2017. Musically, "You're the Best Thing About Me" originated from the band's attempt to write a song in the spirit of Motown, combining rhythmic music with a joyful mood. The lyrics were written by lead vocalist Bono as a love song for his wife, Ali, after he had a nightmare that he had destroyed their relationship. A week prior to the song's single release, U2 re-recorded it while trying to find an arrangement they could perform live, returning the song to the more guitar-oriented style of its original demo. "You're the Best Thing About Me" reached number one on the US Adult Alternative Songs chart. Its release was followed by an electronic dance remix by Norwegian DJ Kygo.

Writing and recording
Guitarist the Edge said that "You're the Best Thing About Me" originated from an attempt to write a song in the spirit of Motown, combining rhythmic music with a joyful mood, although he said there was nothing "obviously Motown" about the end result. Lead vocalist Bono referred to the song as "defiant joy", something that he and the Edge said was more important than ever in the "difficult times" in which they were living. The song first emerged in August 2016 as an electronic dance remix by Norwegian DJ Kygo, which he played during his performance at the Cloud 9 Festival. The song was mentioned in an April 2017 issue of Mojo as a potential contender for Songs of Experience, albeit with a slightly different title.

According to the Edge, the song was one of several from the album for which Bono wrote lyrics to his friends and family after having a "major scare where he really wasn't sure he would be around very much in the future". Bono composed the lyrics after having a dream that he "had destroyed something that's most important to [him] – [his] relationship" with his wife Ali. The Edge described "You're the Best Thing About Me" as a love song but with another layer, as it raises the "cosmic question... why when everything is perfect do we have a tendency to mess it up?" Anticipating a reaction to the song, Bono joked, "You're putting out a song about your girlfriend when the world is on fire?"  The song title was inspired by a comment that Irish media personality Eamon Dunphy made to Bono in a Dublin bar, telling him the best thing about him was Ali.

"You're the Best Thing About Me" was completed one week prior to its release as a single. The Edge said the prior version of the song had a more elaborate, complicated arrangement with a "mellow", "low-key" beginning. When U2 began discussing how to arrange the song for live performances, the guitarist found an early demo of it when they were first testing out various arrangement ideas. After listening to it, the group decided to revert to the song's original, simpler guitar-driven arrangement, using what the Edge called "the primary colors of U2" of guitar, drums, and bass. He said that as a result of the musical change, the lyrics "came to life" and the song had a counterbalance, as he believed the prior version was lyrically too reflective when it was mellower. He said the band worked "furiously" on the new version of the song for two days to meet their deadline for submitting it.

Release and promotion
In a 15 May 2017 article in The Irish Times, Bono first mentioned that the band's next single would be "You're the Best Thing About Me". On 29 August 2017, the song was confirmed to be the first single from Songs of Experience, and it was released on 6 September. The cover photograph, taken by the band's photographer Anton Corbijn, depicts the Edge's daughter, Sian, wearing a military helmet. The image evokes the cover art of the group's 1998 compilation album The Best of 1980–1990, which showed the younger brother of Guggi, a friend of Bono, wearing a similar helmet. On 7 September, the band performed the song on The Tonight Show Starring Jimmy Fallon before debuting it live three days later at a concert in Indianapolis on the Joshua Tree Tour 2017. The song was the band's 42nd track to enter the Alternative Songs chart in the US, further extending their record for the chart. It was also the group's 27th entry on the Adult Alternative Songs chart, the second-most all time; the track eventually reached number one on Adult Alternative Songs, making it U2's record-breaking 13th track to top the chart.

On 15 September, a remix of the song by Kygo was released. The remix was the same collaboration with U2 that he debuted the year prior at the Cloud 9 Festival.

On 29 September, an acoustic version of the song was released.

Music video
The song's official music video was directed by Jonas Åkerlund and premiered on 27 September 2017. It was filmed earlier that month while U2 were in New York City. The footage depicts the band members sightseeing in the city, making a visit to Ray's Pizza and a bar, touring Times Square on a double-decker bus, taking photographs with fans, and performing in front of the city's skyline. The band said the video is "a visual tapestry of tribute to New York and a serenade to the city's iconic symbols of American compassion and liberty".

Personnel
Adapted from the liner notes.

U2
Bono – vocals
The Edge – guitars, vocals, keyboards
Adam Clayton – bass guitar
Larry Mullen Jr. – drums, percussion

Additional performers
Jacknife Lee – additional keyboards, programming
Ryan Tedder – programming
Brent Kutzle – additional programming
Davide Rossi – strings

Technical

Jacknife Lee – production, engineering
Ryan Tedder – production
Brent Kutzle  – production
Steve Lillywhite  – production, mixing
Matt Bishop – engineering
Tyler Spry – engineering
Barry McCready – engineering assistance
Rich Rich – engineering
Matty Green – engineering
Christopher Henry – additional engineering
Richard Rainey – additional engineering
Greg Clooney – additional engineering
Gosha Usov – engineering assistance
Alan Kelly – engineering assistance
Kelana – mixing
Tom Elmhirst – additional mixing
Brandon Bost – mixing assistance

Charts

Weekly charts

Year-end charts

Certifications

Release history

Kygo remix

Norwegian DJ and record producer Kygo released a remix of "You're the Best Thing About Me" on 15 September 2017 by Ultra Music.

References

External links

2017 singles
2017 songs
Interscope Records singles
U2 songs
Song recordings produced by Ryan Tedder
Song recordings produced by Jacknife Lee
Song recordings produced by Steve Lillywhite
Songs written by Bono
Songs written by Adam Clayton
Songs written by the Edge
Songs written by Larry Mullen Jr.
Music videos directed by Jonas Åkerlund